Chuck, Charlie or Charles Platt may refer to:

Charles Z. Platt (1773–1822), American politician, New York State Treasurer, 1813–1817
Charles A. Platt (1861–1933), American landscape gardener and architect of "American Renaissance" movement
Charles Platt (author) (born 1945), English science-fiction writer
Charlie Platt, American wrestling announcer during 1980s for Continental Championship Wrestling
Chuck Platt, American bassist since 1990s for punk rock band Good Riddance
Charlie Comyn-Platt (born 1985), English footballer — position: defender/midfielder